Second Skin is a 1999 Spanish romantic drama film directed by Gerardo Vera, starring Javier Bardem, Jordi Mollà, Ariadna Gil and Cecilia Roth.

Premise
Elena and Alberto, a couple from Madrid, have a happy marriage, professional success and a loving son. However, Elena later finds a hotel receipt in Alberto's pocket and discovers that he has been unfaithful to her. To her surprise, the one who has been involved is another man, Diego.

Cast

Production 
Second Skin is a Antena 3 Televisión, Lolafilms and  production. Filming began in March 1999 in Madrid. Shooting locations also included Benicàssim. The screenplay was penned by Gerardo Vera alongside Ángeles González-Sinde. Other production duties were tasked to Julio Madurga (cinematography) and Roque Baños (score).

Reception 
Reviewing for Miami New Times, David Ehrenstein compared the film to Making Love (1982), considering that the film "is less sexually skittish than its predecessor, and a lot less reassuring about the marital dissolution in the wake of homosexual self-discovery".
The review in Fotogramas scored the film with 3 out of 5 stars, considering the performances by Bardem and Gil to be the best about the film, while citing the "over-emphatic" musical score as a negative point.

Accolades 

|-
| align = "center" | 2000 || 14th Goya Awards || Best Actor || Jordi Mollà ||  || 
|}

See also 
 List of Spanish films of 2000

References

External links
 
 
 

1999 films
1999 LGBT-related films
1999 romantic drama films
1990s Spanish-language films
Spanish LGBT-related films
Spanish romantic drama films
Adultery in films
Gay-related films
LGBT-related romantic drama films
Male bisexuality in film
Films set in Madrid
Films directed by Gerardo Vera
Films scored by Roque Baños
Artisan Entertainment films
Films shot in Madrid
Films shot in the Comunidad Valenciana
LolaFilms films
1990s Spanish films